is a railway station on the  Nanao Line in the town of Anamizu, Hōsu District, Ishikawa Prefecture, Japan, operated by the private railway operator Noto Railway.

Lines

Station layout
The station consists of two opposed unnumbered ground-level side platforms connected by a level crossing. The station is unattended.

Platforms

History
Noto-Nakajima Station opened on 27 August 1932. With the privatization of Japanese National Railways (JNR) on 1 April 1987, the station came under the control of JR West. On 1 September 1991, the section of the Nanao Line from Nanao to Anamizu was separated from JR West into the Noto Railway.

Surrounding area

See also
 List of railway stations in Japan

External links

 

Railway stations in Ishikawa Prefecture
Railway stations in Japan opened in 1932
Nanao Line
Anamizu, Ishikawa